Citrus inodora or Microcitrus inodora, commonly known as Russell River lime or large leaf Australian wild lime, is a tree native to the Bellenden-Ker Range in northern Queensland, Australia.

It grows in lowland tropical rainforest. Much of its native habitat has now been cleared for agricultural use, so the species has become quite rare. There has to date been no commercial use of the fruits.

The fruit is egg-shaped and yellowish-green. Leaves and flowers are essentially odourless, lacking the aromatic oils characteristic of the genus.

Varieties
Citrus maideniana, also known as Microcitrus maideniana, Citrus inodora var. maideniana, and Maiden's Australian lime, is sometimes considered a variety or subspecies of Citrus inodora. The two have similar distributions and the deeply depressed apex of the fruit of Citrus maideniana is the only difference between it and Citrus inodora. It is sometimes considered a synonym of Citrus inodora.

References

External links 

Bushfood
inodora
Edible plants
Flora of Queensland
Plants described in 1889
Sapindales of Australia
inodora